Semizbughy is a village in the Karaganda Region, Kazakhstan. It is part of the Bukhar-Zhyrau rural district (KATO code - 354043200). The village was developed for the operation of a Corundum mine in the Semizbughy mountain. Population:

Geography
Semizbughy is located just below of the western slopes of Semizbughy mountain.  to the east of the village lies Botakara, the district center.

References

External links
VeloKaraganda / Semizbuga 2009
"Тайна четырёх озёр" - Autotourist.kz (in Russian)

Populated places in Karaganda Region

kk:Семізбұғы (ауыл)